Beyt-e Bavi (also Romanized as Beyt-e Bāvī; also known as Bāvi, Shamaklī, Shemālī, and Shomakelī) is a village in Moshrageh Rural District, Moshrageh District, Ramshir County, Khuzestan Province, Iran. At the 2006 census, its population was 662, in 99 families.

References 

Populated places in Ramshir County